Q33 may refer to:
 Q33 (New York City bus)
 Al-Aḥzāb, the 33rd surah of the Quran
 
 Q33 NY, a controversy surrounding the font Windings